The article concerns Augusto Monaco (1903-97), an Italian automobile engineer. See elsewhere for Augusto Monaco (born 1970), a futsal-player representing Argentina national futsal team in 2000 FIFA Futsal World Championship

Augusto Camillo Pietro Monaco (15 March 1903 – 4 November 1997) was an Italian engineer, best known for his racing cars from the early 1930s.

Monaco was born in Buenos Aires, where he earned a degree in engineering before relocating to Turin in the early 1920s, where he  made his automobile engineering contributions:
1927 Monaco-Baudo with Antonio Baudo, a single-cylinder 500 cm3 side-valved engine;
1932 Nardi-Monaco with Enrico Nardi, a front-wheeled twin-cylinder JAP engine (998 cm3, 65 bhp) nicknamed Chichibio, and winning several hillclimbs;
1935 Trossi-Monaco with Carlo Felice Trossi, a 16-cylinder (250 bhp, 3982 cm3) race car, uncompetitive due to an unsuitable 75/25 weight distribution.
Since then he declined an offer to join Fiat, and among several engineering projects, was involved in developing synthetic diamonds, a Swiss-patented invention (1948). Augusto Monaco moved to Livorno in the early 1960s, where he worked on hydraulic systems until his retirement. He died in Livorno, 1997.

References

Italian automotive engineers
People from Buenos Aires
1903 births
1997 deaths